The 1942–43 Magyar Kupa (English: Hungarian Cup) was the 20th season of Hungary's annual knock-out cup football competition.

Final

See also
 1942–43 Nemzeti Bajnokság I

References

External links
 Official site 
 soccerway.com

1942–43 in Hungarian football
1942–43 domestic association football cups
1942-43